Inter-Régions Division (also known as Ligue Inter-Régions de football) is the third-highest division overall in the Algerian football league system. The division has six groups based on the region of the country, which are East, West and Centre-East, Centre-West, South-east and South-west each containing 16 teams from their respective regions. Each year the first from each group are promoted to the Ligue 2, runs by the Ligue Nationale du Football Amateur and the last three clubs from each group are relegated to the Ligue Régional I.

2022-2023 season's teams

References

External links
Ligue Inter-Régions de Football official site

 
4
Association football clubs established in 1962
1962 establishments in Algeria
Third level football leagues in Africa